Kool is a Dutch patronymic surname. Kool is an archaic short form of the given name Nicolaas. Since "kool" means both "cabbage" and "coal" in modern Dutch, for some families the name could conceivably have originated as a metonymic occupational surname, referring to a cabbage farmer or seller, or coal worker. Among variant forms are Coolen, Cools, Koole, Koolen and Kools. People with the surname include:

Corien Kool (born 1959), Dutch CDA politician (married name: Corien Wortmann)
David Kool (born 1987), American college basketball player and coach
Eric Kool (born 1960), American biochemist
Molly Kool (1916–2009), North America's first registered female sea captain
Noah Kool (born 1962), Papua New Guinean politician
Ruud Kool (born 1969), Dutch football midfielder
Willem Gillisz Kool (1608–1666), Dutch landscape painter
Koole
Ricky Koole (born 1972), Dutch singer and film actress
 (born 1953), Dutch political scientist and Labour Party chair 2001–05
Kools
Cor Kools (1907–1985), Dutch football midfielder and manager
Mark Fidel Kools (born 1971), US Army soldier on death row for fragging

See also
Kool (disambiguation)
Cool (disambiguation)

References

Dutch-language surnames
Patronymic surnames